The Alepotrypa Cave is an archaeological site in the Mani region of the Peloponnese peninsula. In addition to being inhabited by early farmers, this site was used for burial and cult purposes. Archaeological evidence has revealed that this is one of the largest Neolithic burial sites ever found in Europe. Two adult human skeletons were found at the site from a burial dating to the 4th millennium BC, as well as remains from at least 170 separate persons. Archaeologists are uncertain about the significance of a Mycenaen ossuary, which has been dated to the 2nd millennium BC and appears to have been reburied at Alepotrypa. While there is no direct evidence, it is possible that the ossuary may link Alepotrypa to Tainaron, which was regarded as the entrance to Hades in classical mythology.

Overview
The Alepotrypa Cave (Greek: Αλεπότρυπα, literally meaning 'The Fox's Hole,' a very common word to describe a cave where a fox lives), is one of the caves of Diros located in the Mani region of the Peloponnese peninsula. The Mani peninsula is mostly made up of Mesozoic carbonate rocks like limestone, which erode as a result of hydrogeological conditions on the peninsula and form karst caves like Alepotrypa.  
Study of the cave's stalagmites has provided information about human activities in the cave and climate variations. By studying variations of trace elements, Meighan Boyd was able to find evidence of certain human activities in the cave, such as burning animal dung. She was also able to confirm and date several periods of drought.

In addition to being one of the earliest known inhabited sites in the southern Laconia region of the Peloponnese, the Alepotrypa Cave is also one of the largest Neolithic burial sites in Europe. Burials in the cave date from between 6,000 and 3200BC, and archaeologists have found bones belonging to at least 170 different persons. Two adult human skeletons were found at the site, dating to the 4th millennium BC, along with a Mycenaen ossuary that archaeologists believe dates to the 2nd millennium BC.

The settlement was abandoned around 3200 BC, after a catastrophic earthquake caused extensive damage that blocked the cave's entrance. Finds from the cave were well-preserved due to the cave's sealed entrance and lack of human activity in the area. The site was threatened by private construction work between 1958–1970, but the Greek Ministry of Culture cancelled the "touristic exploitation" of the site. Excavations led by Giorgos Papathanassopoulos began in 1970, but were delayed until 1978 due to political complications in Greece. The site was excavated between 1978 and 2005, after which the project was largely put on hold due to lack of funding. In 2010 the Diros Regional Project was founded to conduct a regional survey as the Alepotrypa excavation team began to prepare their findings for publication. Late Neolithic (LN) material has been found in the cave itself, but as of 2013 the survey team has only found material dating to the Final Neolithic (FN) in the nearby open-air areas.

Archaeology
During the Neolithic era, the cave itself served as a burial site while farmers inhabited a large village outside the cave. Based on evidence found at the site, archaeologists believe that the early farmers who inhabited this area ate mostly barley and wheat, and suggest that non-lethal head injuries found on the skulls may indicate violent confrontations. Primary burial, cremation and secondary burial are all represented at the site, and it was also used for shelter and storage. Evidence of cultic practice has also been found, including the head of a stalagmite type marble idol.

Other finds from the excavation include Late Neolithic stone, pottery and clay vessels, jewelry and weapons. Painted and incised pottery, shell beads, stone axes, and a complete flint arrowhead have been found, along with blades and flakes of Melian obsidian. Silver jewelry found at the site suggests the area was wealthy, as silver was extremely rare in Bronze Age and Neolithic Europe. A rare early copper axe, which scholars believe can be dated to the Final Neolithic period, was also found at the Alepotrypa site. Paul Cartledge writes that "there was apparently no transitional Chalcolithic phase in the Peloponnese" and adds that the copper tools found in the Alepotrypa Cave "provide a convenient transition" to the Early Helladic era.

Comparisons to Hades
Mythological tradition says there was an entrance to the underworld domain of the Greek god of death Hades at the nearby site of Tainaron, and archaeologists working on the excavation believe it is possible that the cultural memory of the burial site at Alepotrypa had become associated with Tainaron by the classical period. Archaeologists have speculated that a later Mycenaean ossuary dating from 1300BC may have been carried to the site for reburial during the late Bronze Age. One possible explanation offered by the lead excavator Giorgos Papathanassopoulos is that the persons who inhabited this site took the cultural memory of an underground realm where the dead were buried with them.  Anastasia Papathanasiou, co-director of the Diros excavation added that "there's no direct evidence, but we can't rule out that possibility".

See also 

 Embracing Skeletons of Alepotrypa

References 

Ancient Greek archaeological sites in Peloponnese (region)
Neolithic sites in Greece
Hades
Caves of Greece